Stahlianthus is a genus of plants in the ginger family. It is native to southern China, the Himalayas, and Indochina.

 Stahlianthus andersonii (Baker) Craib ex Loes. in H.G.A.Engler - Myanmar
 Stahlianthus campanulatus Kuntze - Thailand, Vietnam
 Stahlianthus involucratus (King ex Baker) Craib ex Loes. in H.G.A.Engler - Fujian, Guangdong, Guangxi, Yunnan, Darjiling, Assam, Sikkim, Bhutan, Bangladesh, Thailand, Myanmar
 Stahlianthus macrochlamys (Baker) Craib - Thailand, Myanmar
 Stahlianthus pedicellatus Chaveer. & Mokkamul - Thailand
 Stahlianthus philippianus (A.Dietr.) Loes. in H.G.A.Engler - apparently extinct, origins unknown
 Stahlianthus thorelii Gagnep. - Laos, Thailand

References

Zingiberoideae
Zingiberaceae genera